Sawaya is a surname, and may refer to:

 Christina Sawaya (born 1980), Lebanese beauty queen
 George Sawaya (1923–2003), American actor and stuntman
 George Sawaya Jr., known as George Murdock, Lebanese-American actor
 Kunio Sawaya, Japanese engineer
 Nathan Sawaya (born 1973), American Lego artist
 Nicole Sawaya, Lebanese-American media executive